Arthur Wellesley Gray (1876 – 7 May 1944) was a British Columbia cabinet minister and mayor. He is particularly noted for his work creating some of British Columbia's early provincial parks and Wells Gray Provincial Park is named for him. His colleagues usually called him by his nickname, "Wells".

Gray was born in New Westminster, British Columbia, in 1876 and was considered the city's greatest son because few native-born British Columbians before him attained cabinet posts. As a youth, he achieved distinction in lacrosse and was a member of the New Westminster Salmonbelly Club which won the world lacrosse championship in 1900. At age 30, Gray was elected alderman of New Westminster and at age 36 he became mayor, a post he held from 1913 to 1919 and again from 1927 to 1930. In 1927, he was also elected to the British Columbia Legislature in Victoria and was re-elected at the next four provincial elections with significant majorities which reflected the high esteem in which he was held by the people of New Westminster. In 1933, Premier Duff Pattullo appointed Gray Minister of Lands and in 1941, under the Coalition Government, he was given the additional duties of Minister of Municipal Affairs.

In 1938, with the assistance of British Columbia's Chief Forester, Ernest Callaway Manning, Gray began to enact legislation creating provincial parks. Tweedsmuir Park was first, located in the Coast Mountains, and it remained the province's largest park until 1993. Later that year, Hamber Park in the Rocky Mountains was set aside. In 1939, a large park was proposed for the drainage basin of the Clearwater River and, when the Order in Council to establish it was passed, the park was named Wells Gray in honour of the minister. The next park was being planned for the Cascade Range of southern British Columbia and was dedicated as Ernest C. Manning Provincial Park after Manning was killed in a plane crash in 1941. Tourists and hikers of the 21st century owe much to the vision of Gray and Manning.

Gray took a tour of the British Columbia interior region during the summer of 1940 and spent four days in Wells Gray Park. He rode the train to Clearwater, then was driven to the end of the road at the park boundary where he stayed at the Helset Ranch. He travelled by horse to see Helmcken Falls, camped at The Horseshoe on the Clearwater River for two nights, then boated along Mahood Lake to stay at Mahood Lake Lodge overnight.

Gray died suddenly in Victoria from a heart ailment on May 7, 1944. The Attorney-General, Hon. R.L. Maitland, commented, "No man ever had a greater interest in his own town than he had in New Westminster and everywhere you look in the Royal City you see a monument to something he has accomplished there. A quiet lovable man, he will be greatly missed by the thousands who knew him."

References

1876 births
1944 deaths
Mayors of New Westminster
British Columbia Liberal Party MLAs